Ghost Hawk Brewing Company is a microbrewery in Clifton and is the one of two production breweries in Passaic County, New Jersey.

History
Ghost Hawk was started by Clifton natives Thomas Rachelski and Steven Bauer, but it grew to encompass Chris Sheehan, who was the head brewer at Chelsea Craft Brewery and 
Gun Hill Brewing. The brewery opened April 20, 2019 and was the first production brewery in Passaic County since Paterson Consolidated Brewing Company closed after Prohibition. They came in 2nd place during News 12's 2019 Brewery Battle. In December 2019 the brewery almost shut down when one of the founders suffered from a stroke, but a GoFund me was created and raised $15,000. Currently they produce about 1,200 barrels a year in their 15-barrel brewhouse and is on tap in over 100 different bars and restaurants in norther and central New Jersey.

Beers and other products
Ghost Hawk brews many different beers, but has four Flagship products:
Ghost Hawk Lager
Apex Predator New England IPA
Ravendark Foreign Export Stout
Daedalion Wheat Beer

Licensing and associations
Ghost Hawk has a limited brewery license from the New Jersey Division of Alcoholic Beverage Control, which allows it to produce up to 300,000 barrels of beer per year, to sell on-premises as part of a tour, and to distribute to wholesalers and at festivals. The brewery is a member of the New Jersey Brewers Association and New Jersey Craft Beer Club.

See also
Alcohol laws of New Jersey
Beer in New Jersey
List of wineries, breweries, and distilleries in New Jersey

References

Beer brewing companies based in New Jersey
2019 establishments in New Jersey
Clifton, New Jersey
Beer brewing companies based in Passaic County, New Jersey